"Strange Brew" is a song by the British rock band Cream.  First released as a single in June 1967 in the UK and US, it was later added to their second studio album Disraeli Gears. The song features Eric Clapton on lead vocals rather than the usual lead by Jack Bruce. The single peaked at number 17 on the UK Singles Chart in July of that same year. In the UK, it was the last Cream single to be released by Reaction Records.

Background
In April 1967, during their first trip to New York, Cream recorded a song called "Lawdy Mama" with Ahmet Ertegun at Atlantic Studios, at the beginning of the sessions for what would become the Disraeli Gears album. The band cut two versions of the song, the first a typical blues shuffle, and the second converted to straight time in a more rock 'n' roll style (both versions can be heard on the Those Were the Days collection). Producer Felix Pappalardi took the tape of the second version of "Lawdy Mama" and, with help from his wife Gail Collins, transformed the song into "Strange Brew" which according to Eric Clapton "created a pop song without completely destroying the original groove." One journalist noted that Clapton at this stage was employing Albert King guitar stylings; and that both "Strange Brew" and another Cream track, "Born Under a Bad Sign", "were practically Albert King parodies". Clapton performs lead vocals on the song mostly in falsetto. It was the first Cream single on which he sang lead. Unlike the group's previous single, "I Feel Free", no promotional video was made for the song, but the band mimed to it on television on the German program Beat Club on 19 May 1967. The song later appeared on the soundtrack of the 1979 feature film, More American Graffiti.

Reception
Cash Box called it a "driving, frenetic, medium-paced rock venture."

Chart performance
The song "Strange Brew" first appeared on the UK Singles Chart on the week ending 10 June 1967 at number 43. It hit its highest position number 17 on the week ending 15 July and then was at position number 35 in the week ending 5 August, its final week, having spent a total of nine weeks in the chart.

In the same week ending 8 July 1967 in the Netherlands, the song also peaked at number 18 on the Dutch Single Top 100 and number 30 on the Dutch Top 40. In Belgium, it also peaked at number 50 on 2 September 1967 in the Wallonia region of Ultratop 50.

Personnel
Eric Clapton – lead vocals, lead guitar, rhythm guitar
Jack Bruce – bass guitar, backing vocal
Ginger Baker – drums

Charts

References

Cream (band) songs
1967 singles
Songs written by Eric Clapton
Songs written by Felix Pappalardi
Song recordings produced by Felix Pappalardi
Polydor Records singles
1967 songs
Reaction Records singles